This is the list of notable stars in the constellation Ara, sorted by decreasing brightness.

 Notes

See also
List of stars by constellation

References

 Wagman, M., (2003). Lost Stars, The McDonald & Woodward Publishing Co., Blackburg, Virginia.

List
Ara